Stredair Appuah (born 27 June 2004) is a French professional footballer who plays as a Right Winger for Ligue 1 club Nantes.

Club career
A youth product of Paris Saint-Germain, Appuah transferred to FC Nantes on 20 May 2021, signing a 3-year contract. He began his senior career with the reserves of Nantes in 2022, before being promoted to their senior side in March 2023. He made his professional debut with Nantes as a late substitute in a 2–2 Ligue 2 tie with OGC Nice on 12 March 2023, assisting his sides second goal.

Personal life
Born in Paris, France, Appuah is of Ghanaian descent.

References

External links
 

2004 births
Living people
Footballers from Paris
French footballers
French sportspeople of Ghanaian descent
Association football fullbacks
FC Nantes players
Ligue 1 players
Championnat National 3 players